Los Haticos is a village and corregimiento in the municipality of Valledupar within the Colombian Department of Cesar. The town lies on the steps of the Sierra Nevada de Santa Marta in the Colombian Caribbean region.

Geography

The corregimiento of Los Haticos borders to the north with the corregimientos of La Mina and Atanquez, to the south with the corregimiento of Rio Seco and to the northeast with the corregimiento of Patillal.

History

The Corregimiento of Los Haticos was created on August 18, 1980, by Municipal Accord 007 of that same year.

Veredas

Haticos Chindo
Haticos López
Haticos Pastrana 
Sevilla

References

Corregimientos of Valledupar
Corregimientos of Colombia